Should I Really Do It? (Bunu Gerçekten Yapmalı Mıyım?) is feature film by Ismail Necmi, starring Petra Woschniak and HEROLD.

The film is a hybrid documentary and fictional feature, following the life of Petra, a German woman living in Istanbul. It is an ironic inversion of more conventional tales of Turkish migrants to Germany, Edgy and surreal, the film plays on concepts of real life and drama, reworking the cult genre of Turkish Fantastic Cinema as it interweaves apparently everyday sequences of Petra's life with increasingly fantastic sessions between her and mysterious, masked HEROLD.

Synopsis
This real-life feature follows the extraordinary life of PETRA, a German woman living in Istanbul, in an ironic inversion of the familiar story of Turkish migrants to Germany. Her life will take such strange turns you’ll think she’s following a script. But really, we’re watching a real life protagonist evolve in the
face of life. For, ultimately, nothing is ever as surprising as life. Except, perhaps, fiction! During 'sessions' with the mysterious, masked HEROLD, her life unfolds before our eyes and we will learn about everything: Istanbul, Germany, family, friends, drugs and death. “Should I Really Do It?” plays with these concepts of real life and fiction, documentary and drama... Could life ever be more interesting than fiction?

Press
“Truth might well be stranger than fiction, but who would have thought it could be so hallucinogenic?
The film follows the surreal story of Petra (Petra Woschniak), a mesmerizing figure who scours the streets of Istanbul. We are introduced to her twilight universe via daily sessions with her very unusual therapist Herold (Herold). This masked conversationalist is a wine-sipping, coke-sniffing man of unspecified sexual orientation who tries to break down Petra's defences while maintaining his own. Hidden behind a leather S&M mask and topped off with a variety of flamboyant wigs, he talks her through her deepest fears, though his intentions are unclear.
They talk about her life, which initially comes off as a never-ending party. Sporting an intimidating shaved head, Petra is involved with fashion and other artistic endeavours, and has actually made a name for herself as a hairdresser. Residing in Istanbul as an illegal immigrant, the thirty-eight-year-old German enjoys wide recognition in local alternative circles. She spends her time experiencing life and consuming large quantities of drugs, until the day comes when she has to pay her dues.
Petra lost her father, her mother and one of her own kidneys to cancer, and now it seems her twin sister is about to become a casualty of the disease as well. Swiftly leaving Istanbul to care for her sibling in Germany, Petra finds her life suddenly transformed into a series of quiet, homey afternoons in the countryside with her sister's dogs. It seems she has decided to take a break from her exorbitant lifestyle and befriend the boring neighbours. But will she be able to suppress her Istanbul personality forever? And what is the big secret behind her self-inflicted isolation?
Luring us in with a promise of a rational explanation, Ismail Necmi introduces us to a shadowy world of serpentine women and fetishistic males. Moving between fantasy and reality, you soon discover the best place is in between, a nifty little spot where you can be anyone you want to be, no explanations, no holds barred. Necmi, a renowned photographer, moves easily between these realms with fascinating confidence. The result is an intelligent, original and strikingly attractive film.”
Dimitri Eipides – Toronto IFF Programmer

"I've already watched this extraordinary film 4 or 5 times. In my opinion, it has only one fault – it's addictive!"
Feride Çiçekoğlu – Film Critic

"One can only do something totally original by breaking with all received wisdom. ‘Should I Really Do It?’ does. Fearlessly."
Fatih Özgüven – Film Critic

Awards
Daniel Langlois Innovation Award – 38th Montreal International Festival du Nouveau Cinéma 2009 – International Competition 
Most Promising New Director Award – 20th Ankara International Film Festival 2009 – National Competition
Most Promising New Screenwriter Award – 20th Ankara International Film Festival 2009 – National Competition
Audience Choice Award – 1st Rome Gender DocuFilm Festival 2010 – International Competition

Special screenings
Conference Opening Film – An Interdisciplinary Conference on Fetishism – “Substitute Lack! / Accept No Substitutes!” – Istanbul MODERN – Museum of Modern Art
Conference Opening Film – New Directions in Turkish Film Studies Conference IX – "Cinema and Reality" – Istanbul Kadir Has University
Special Presentation – "Women in a Midlife Crisis" – Neues Kino Basel – Switzerland

Festivals 2009 – 2010
34th Toronto International Film Festival 2009 – Official Selection – Discovery
38th Montreal International Festival du Nouveau Cinéma 2009 – International Competition – Louve d’Or – Daniel Langlois Innovation Award
6th Reykjavik International Film Festival 2009 – International Competition – New Visions
25th Haifa International Film Festival 2009 – International Fipresci Competition – New Directors / New Horizons
33rd São Paulo International Film Festival 2009 – International Competition – New Directors
1st Rome Gender DocuFilm Festival 2010 – International Competition – Visions Around The Body – Audience Choice Award
17th Hamburg International Film Festival 2009 – Official Selection – Agenda 09
33rd Cairo International Film Festival 2009 – Official Selection – Festival of Festivals 
7th World Film Festival of Bangkok 2009 – Official Selection – World Cinema: Cinema Beat 
11th Mumbai Film Festival 2009 – Official Selection – Above the Cut
11th Thessaloniki Documentary Festival 2009 – Official Selection – Portraits: Human Journeys
3rd Costa Rica International Film Festival 2009 – Official Selection – Montezuma
20th Ankara International Film Festival 2009 – National Competition – Most Promising New Director Award – Most Promising New Screenwriter Award
33rd Göteborg International Film Festival 2010 – Official Selection – New Visions
10th Wroclaw Era New Horizons International Film Festival 2010 – Official Selection – New Cinema of Turkey

References

External links

 

2009 films
Turkish documentary films
2000s Turkish-language films
2000s German-language films
Films set in Turkey
2009 multilingual films
Turkish multilingual films